Zachary King (born February 4, 1990) is an American internet personality based in Los Angeles. He is most known for his "magic vines," which are six-second videos digitally edited to look as if he is doing magic. He calls his videos "digital sleight of hand." He began posting videos on YouTube in 2008 and in 2013 he started posting videos to Vine. King posted his first video to TikTok in 2016, and has since attracted over 90 million followers, making him the sixth most-followed individual on the platform.

King won the Hewlett-Packard commercial contest in 2010, and got a trip to the red carpet at the London Film Festival. In 2013, he won YouTube's NextUp Creators contest. In 2015, King and his wife Rachel Holm competed in the 28th season of the American reality game show The Amazing Race. They were eliminated during the ninth leg of the race being placed sixth in the overall standings.

Early life and education 
King was born and raised in Portland, Oregon. He is of half Chinese descent from his paternal side, one quarter Austrian and one quarter Nicaraguan descent from his maternal side. King's mother homeschooled him and his three sisters, including one adopted sister, while his father worked in their home office. When he was seven, King made his first film using a home video camera. When he was fourteen, he purchased video equipment including a Mac computer, cameras as well as a tripod and started making and editing videos. He graduated from Biola University with a Cinema and Media Arts Major in December 2012.

Career 
King started his website, FinalCutKing.com in 2008, to offer training and tips about using the editing software Final Cut Pro as he was unable to find tutorials for the software on the Internet. At the same time, he started using his YouTube channel to give tutorials for visual effects using the Software. After gaining an audience for his website, he began selling training seminars and used the money to pay for his college. He participated as a contestant on an episode of Viral Video Showdown that aired on Syfy in 2012. In December 2019, King baffled the internet with a video of himself apparently flying on a broomstick. The video was viewed over 2.1 billion times on TikTok in 4 days.

YouTube 

In 2011, he posted a video titled Jedi Kittens on YouTube that he produced with a college friend. The video showed two cats fighting with lightsabers. The video gained over a million views in three days and went on to have over 18 million views. A sequel of the video titled Jedi Kittens Strike Back gained over 27 million views. A third part of the video, Jedi Kittens – The Force Awakens was posted in 2013, which has gained over 28 million views. King's official YouTube channel is named Zach King.

He was named by YouTube as one of the 25 most promising young film-makers in America in May 2013. As part of its Next Up Creators contest, YouTube awarded King $35,000 as well as a trip to New York City for a four-day YouTube Creator Camp. His submission to the contest was titled Contest Entry Gone Wrong. In the video, he appeared to dodge an assault by airstrikes and ground fire as he pleaded his case to be selected for the YouTube award. As of July 2021, he has 11.2 million subscribers and 1.19 billion views within 350 videos.

Vines 
King made his account on Vine on September 9, 2013, when he saw that many of his friends had an account on the social media website. After creating an account on Vine, he decided to create one Vine each day for the next thirty days. After the success of his first few Vines, he decided to continue with creating and posting new Vines.

He appeared on The Ellen DeGeneres Show on January 29, 2014, and made several Vines with the crew of the show. King formerly created Vine videos for a living and worked out of his garage. In an interview with The Independent, he said that he would want to direct feature films, preferably action-adventure movies, in the future.

King has been featured in multiple media outlets for his Vines. Chez Pazienza wrote about King that "this guy's stuff is pure magic (or at least the work of some very clever editing.)" Mashable's Laura Vitto wrote of his work, "Vine star and filmmaker Zach King may not perform magic in the traditional sense, but his expertly-edited six-second videos could put David Blaine to shame."

Writing for Complex magazine, J. Duaine Hahn wrote that "While people have hit Vine stardom for skits, or splicing together commentary with popular YouTube videos, King has gone the extra mile to use his six seconds to create magic, or the closest thing you can get to it with on a smartphone."

In an interview, Zach said that “producing a Vine usually takes upwards of 24 hours, with three to four hours of filming”.

TikTok
King posted his first video to TikTok, formerly known as Musical.ly, on February 28, 2016, which was him escaping a jail cell. His video caption was "Need help posting bail, oh wait nevermind." As of November 2021, he has amassed a following of over 66.3 million followers on the popular app, making him the third most followed user on TikTok.

Zach King also posted the most viewed TikTok on December 9, 2019. The video was of him riding a broomstick, where he later shows he was actually using a mirror. The caption of the video was "They rejected my application to Hogwarts but I still found a way to be a wizard." The video received an estimate of 2 billion views.

Religion and personal life
When King was seven, his family converted to Christianity, which he states is one of the "greatest things" that has happened in his life. He considers himself as a devout Christian, such as attempting to read parts of the Bible when he wakes up every morning. He is also vocal with his faith, even incorporating his religion into his videos. King attended Biola University, a Protestant University, and had led youth groups at various Christian camps.

King proposed to his girlfriend, Rachel Holm, while pretending to create a video advertisement for one of her brands. They got married in 2014. In 2016, they competed together on The Amazing Race 28 and placed 6th. As of 2017, they lived in Rossmoor, an unincorporated community in Orange County, California. Both King and his wife have adopted siblings, which would later inspire her to work as a case manager for adoptive and foster-care. The couple have fostered a few children, as well as having both an adopted and a biological son.

Filmography

Awards and honors
2009 – First place London Film Festival for HP advertisement
2009 – Critic's Choice Award at Bridgestone Tires's Safety Scholars Teen Driver Video Contest.
2010 – First place London Film Festival: Heartbrand Ad
2010 – Bridgestone Safety Scholar Winner
2012 – Vidcon Golden Poop Award
2013 – YouTube's NextUp Creators Contest
2016 – Shorty Award for Best Vine Artist

References

External links

1990 births
Living people
Biola University alumni
American people of Chinese descent
American people of Austrian descent
American people of Nicaraguan descent
Filmmakers from Portland, Oregon
The Amazing Race (American TV series) contestants
Vine (service) celebrities
American TikTokers
Shorty Award winners
American film directors
YouTube filmmakers
DIY YouTubers